Robert "Bob" Monette (born February 18, 1952) is a politician in Ottawa, Ontario, Canada. He first joined political life in 1985 when he served on the Cumberland City Council for six years.  Monette returned to serve on the Ottawa City Council in January 2006 in a by-election and was then reelected in November 2006 and October 2010.

Prior to being elected, Monette served as the constituency office manager to MPP Phil McNeely of the Ontario Liberal Party. He ran for the Liberal Party of Canada nomination for the 1988 Canadian federal election but lost.

Monette currently sits on the Planning Committee, Transportation Committee and the Hydro Ottawa Holdings Board. Monette has also been elected by Council to sit on both the Central Canada Exhibition Association and the Heart of Orléans Business Improvement Association.

Monette has assisted at cleaning up the Ottawa River; helping to secure over 100 million dollars in funding from all the levels of three levels of government after his 2008 tour of the ROPEC facility.  Monette is also focused on the development of Lansdowne Park, and actively participated in the Lansdowne Live proposal.  Monette also supports Kettle Island as the new location of the Interprovincial Bridge.

Some of Monette's local accomplishments are, opening up a community garden, the first ever Seniors Park in Eastern Ontario, facilitated in the development of Orléans first hotel in 30 years: Quality Inn, worked in paternership with Forum Inc to develop the Town Centre, and ensuring that Orleans is graffiti free.

Monette has been involved in many non-profit groups including, the Cumberland Community Resource Centre; Ottawa Arthritis Society; Queenswood Heights Neighbourhood Watch Association; Queenswood Heights Community Association, Fallingbrook Community Association.

There was much speculation that Monette would run for the Ontario Progressive Conservative Party in the 2011 Ontario general election. However, on March 2, 2011, he announced he would not be running. He switched to the Tories after disagreement with the policies of Premier Dalton McGuinty.

Monette resides in Queenswood Heights with his wife and three children. On June 13, 2018 he announced he would not seek re-election in the 2018 municipal election.

Controversy
During Ottawa's 2008-2009 Bus Strike, Monette threatened legal action against Councillor Clive Doucet for speaking out against the city's bargaining strategy.

In March 2009, Monette attempted to block atheist slogans from being advertised on OC Transpo buses in an Ottawa City Council motion, despite a legal opinion that such censorship would probably fail in a court challenge.

Bob Monette is firmly in favour of the Corridor 5 (Kettle Island) option for an interprovincial bridge between Ottawa and Gatineau.  According to a report released by the consultants engaged to explore bridge options (www.ncrcrossings.ca), a bridge at Kettle Island would result in severe congestion at key intersections along Aviation Parkway for East-West traffic between Ottawa and Orleans.

Election results

Cumberland municipal election, 1985

Cumberland municipal election, 1988

Cumberland mayoral election, 1991

1994 Ottawa-Carleton Regional Municipality elections

Orleans by-election, 2006

Ottawa municipal election, 2006

2010 Ottawa municipal election

2014 Ottawa municipal election

References

External links
Bob Monette election website
Bob Monette city of Ottawa website
City bio

Ottawa city councillors
Franco-Ontarian people
Living people
1952 births